Sorbonne Law School may refer to:

 Faculty of Law of Paris (c. 1150-1970), the historical Law School or faculty of law of the University of Paris (nicknamed "Sorbonne")
 Université Paris-Panthéon-Assas (1971–present), successor of the Faculty of Law of Paris, delivering law courses for the Sorbonne University as an independent university
 École de droit de la Sorbonne (2009–present), the official name for the legal department of Pantheon-Sorbonne University 
 Faculté de droit de l’Université Sorbonne Paris Nord (2020;present), the legal department of Sorbonne Paris North University

See also
Law schools in France (disambiguation)
Paris Law School (disambiguation)

References